Charles Raven may refer to:
Charles E. Raven (1885–1964), English theologian, academic and pacifist
Charles Edmund Raven (died 1940), Canadian politician